Dadie Mayila (born January 11, 1990) is a Congolese professional footballer currently playing for Yverdon-Sport on loan from Lausanne-Sport.

External links

1990 births
Living people
Democratic Republic of the Congo footballers
Democratic Republic of the Congo expatriate footballers
Expatriate footballers in Switzerland
FC Lausanne-Sport players
Association football midfielders
21st-century Democratic Republic of the Congo people